Webber Greens is a new neighbourhood in west Edmonton, Alberta, Canada.  
It is bounded on the east by Anthony Henday Drive and on the west by Winterburn Road.

The Anthony Henday provides access to destinations to the south of the city including the Edmonton International Airport.

As of January 20, 2008, the City of Edmonton map utility contained virtually no data on this area.  As this area develops, more data should become available.

Demographics 
In the City of Edmonton's 2012 municipal census, Webber Greens had a population of  living in  dwellings.

Surrounding neighbourhoods

References 

Neighbourhoods in Edmonton